Titli is a Pakistani romantic drama serial which aired on Urdu1, it is produced by 7th Sky Entertainment and directed by Ahmed Bhatti. It stars Ali Abbas, Hania Amir and Abid Ali. The story of this drama is based on a true story of a very beautiful lady called Nayla. The serial premiered on 20 January 2017, every Friday on Urdu 1 and ended on 26 June 2017.

Plot
A very beautiful and egotistical girl Naila lives in a middle-class household with her younger sister Zara, parents and older brother Kamran/ Kammy. Her cousin Zamee also stays with them for some time. Naila falls in love with Zamee just because of his beauty but Zamee reveals that he is in love with Naila's younger sister Zara. Devastated, Naila forces Zara to reject Zamee to take revenge. Naila marries a dark-skinned but rich lad Ahmed just for his wealth and she proves to be a horrible wife and daughter in law as she talks in an extremely rude way to her husband and in laws despite the fact that they love her a lot. Naila gets worried and prays for her child not to look like the father. Luckily for Naila, she gives birth to a very beautiful baby Amna. Naila continues to torture her in laws unnecessarily. Naila believes that her in laws love their choti bahu more because of which she demands Ahmed a home independent of her in-laws or divorce. Naila gives birth to another daughter Maryam and they move to a different house post a leap. Naila soon begins an extra marital affair with a lovely neighbor Rehan. Naila soon gets closer to Rehan and they both start loving each other. Amna catches Naila and Rehan together and runs away with her sister but they both get kidnapped in the attempt. Amna and Maryam get saved by the police.

Trailer
The first teaser of the serial shows the protagonist Naila talking to the moon saying "Where were you? I know, there will be a day you will come to me, and will recognize me by the shine of my eyes and by the beauty of my face. You will come, and will get hold of my hand. Then we will be even I will just say one thing to you ----you have flaws"

Cast 
Hania Amir as Naila, protagonist
Ali Abbas as Ahmad, Naila's first husband 
Emmad Irfani as Rehan, Naila's second husband
Tauqeer Ahmed as Amir, Ahmad's younger brother
Shameen Khan as Zara, Naila's younger sister
Abid Ali as Ahmad's father
Naeem Tahir
Saba Faisal as Naila's mother
Sumera Hassan as Suraiyya
Seemi Pasha as Naila's mother-in-law
Atif Rathore
Shahzia Shah
Taqi Ahmed as Zamee

References

2017 Pakistani television series debuts
Pakistani drama television series
Urdu-language television shows